An oral law is a code of conduct in use in a given culture, religion or community application, by which a body of rules of human behaviour is transmitted by oral tradition and effectively respected, or the single rule that is orally transmitted.

Many cultures have an oral law, while most contemporary legal systems have a formal written organisation. The oral tradition (from the Latin tradere = to transmit) is the typical instrument of transmission of the oral codes or, in a more general sense, is the complex of what a culture transmits of itself among the generations, "from father to son". This kind of transmission can be due to lack of other means, such as in illiterate or criminal societies, or can be expressly required by the same law.

There has been a continuous debate over oral versus written transmission, with the focus on the perceived higher reliability of written evidence, primarily based on the "linear world of academia" where only written down records are accepted. However, "standard" theories of orality and literacy have been proposed.

In jurisprudence 

From a legal point of view, an oral law can be:
a habit, or custom with legal relevance or when the formal law expressly refers to it (but in this latter case, it is properly an indirect source of legal rights and obligations);
a spoken command  or order that has to be respected as a law (in most modern western legal systems, some dispositions can be issued by word in given cases of emergency).
An oral law, intended as a body of rules, can be admitted in jurisprudence as long as it shows some efficacy, therefore it needs that the law is public, the human action is evaluated by a judge (ordinarily producing a sentence according to the general interpretation of the law) and then a punishment has eventually to be put into effect. Some oral laws provide all these elements (for instance, some codes of conduct in use among criminal associations like the Mafia do have a well known law, a judge, a condemnation), while others usually miss some of them.

In Judaism 

Rabbinic Judaism maintains that the books of the Tanakh were transmitted in parallel with an oral tradition, as relayed by God to Moses and from him handed on to the scholarly and other religious leaders of each generation. Thus, in Judaism, the "Written Instruction" (Torah she-bi-khtav תורה שבכתב) comprises the Torah and the rest of the Tanakh; the "Oral Instruction" (Torah she-be'al peh תורה שבעל פה) was ultimately recorded in the Talmud (lit. "Learning") and Midrashim (lit. "Interpretations"). The interpretation of the Oral Torah is thus considered as the authoritative reading of the Written Torah. Further, Halakha (lit. "The Path", frequently translated as "Jewish Law") is based on a written instruction together with an oral instruction. Jewish law and tradition is thus not based on a literal reading of the Tanakh, but on the combined oral and written tradition.

See also 
 Common law
 Customary law
 Hadith
 Jurisprudence
 Revelation
 Uncodified constitution

Citations and notes

References
 Finnegan, Ruth H., A Note on Oral Tradition and Historical Evidence, in History and Theory 10 (1970), 195–201.
 Goody, J.,  & Watt,I., ? in J. Goody (ed.), Literacy in Traditional Societies (Cambridge, 1968)
 Story of the Jewish People - The Jewish Law

Further reading
 Vansina, J., (tr. Wright), Oral Tradition:A Study in Historical Methodology (London, 1965)
 Vansina, J., Oral Tradition as History (Wisconsin, 1985)
 Finnegan, Ruth H., Oral Poetry: Its Nature, Significance and Social Context (Cambridge, 1977)
 Henige, D.P., The Chronology of Oral Tradition: Quest for a Chimera (Oxford, 1974)
 Henige, D.P., Oral Historiography (London, 1982)
 Tonkin, Elizabeth, Narrating our Pasts: The Social Construction of Oral History (Cambridge, 1992).

Legal history
Religious law
Oral tradition
Custom